Gayang-daero is a road located in Gyeonggi Province and Seoul, South Korea.

Stopovers
 Seoul
 Mapo District
 Gyeonggi Province
 Goyang
 Seoul
 Mapo District - Eunpyeong District

List of Facilities 
 Note
 IC : Interchange (나들목)
 IS : Intersection (평면 교차로)
 BUS : Bus Stop (버스 정류장)
 BR : Bridge (교량)
 The route marker only available in Seoul area.

References

Roads in Seoul
Roads in Gyeonggi